McNally may refer to:

 McNally (surname), an Irish surname
 McNally (crater), a crater on the Moon
 Re Wakim; Ex parte McNally, a case decided in the High Court of Australia
 McNally v. United States, a court case on the definition of mail fraud

See also
 Bishop McNally High School in  Calgary, Alberta, Canada
 McNally High School in Edmonton, Alberta, Canada
 McNally Robinson, a small chain of Canadian independent bookstores
 McNally Smith College of Music, a music school based in Saint Paul, Minnesota 
 Rand McNally, a publishing company